Julia Delaney (born 8 February 1934 in County Wexford) is an Irish politician who was a member of the House of Keys from 1986 to 1991. She is the wife of Dominic Delaney.

References

Members of the House of Keys 1986–1991
Politicians from County Wexford
Irish expatriates in the United Kingdom
20th-century Manx politicians
20th-century British women politicians
1934 births
Living people